Pradhan Mantri Atmanirbhar Swasth Bharat Yojana (PMASBY) is a healthcare programme launched in 2021 by Ministry of Health and Family Welfare. The programme was announced during the 2021 Union budget of India, with  earmarked to improve the infrastructure of India's public health system by fiscal year 2025–26.

See also
 National Health Mission

References 

Government programmes of India
Modi administration initiatives